The 2013–14 season was Brighton & Hove Albion Football Club's third consecutive season in the Championship. It was their first season under the management of Óscar García following the suspension and sacking of Gus Poyet in the summer. Brighton reached the playoffs for a second consecutive season after finishing 6th, however after losing 6–2 on aggregate to Derby County in the semi finals Garcia resigned as manager.

Squad

Statistics

|-
|colspan="14"|Players who left the club during the season:

|}

Captains
As of 28 November 2013

Goalscorers
As of 11 May 2014

Disciplinary record
As of 11 May 2014

Contracts

Pre-season

Friendlies

Competitions

League table

Result summary

Result by round

Matches

Championship

Championship play-offs

League Cup

FA Cup

Transfers
All transfers update as of 16 October 2013.

In

Loans In

Out

Overall summary

Summary
As of 11 May 2014

Score overview
As of 3 May 2014

References

Brighton & Hove Albion F.C. seasons
Brighton and Hove Albion